The women's high jump event at the 1932 Olympic Games took place August 7. When world record holder and returning silver medalist Lien Gisolf  failed at 1.60, the medalists were determined. Eva Dawes made the next height but was unable to make 1.62m leaving her with the bronze medal. The two American jumpers Jean Shiley and Babe Didrikson jumped evenly through the rest of the competition. But after Didrikson’s jump, the officials convened and ruled that she had jumped head-first, which was then illegal, and was termed diving. This gave the gold medal to Jean Shiley. Didrikson later noted that she had jumped in the same style throughout the competition.

Results

Final standings

Key: WR = World record

References

Women's high jump
High jump at the Olympics
1932 in women's athletics
Ath